The Walking Stick is a 1970 British crime drama film directed by Eric Till and starring David Hemmings and Samantha Eggar. It was based on the 1967 novel of the same title by Winston Graham.  "Cavatina" was used as the film's theme, eight years before the piece became famous as the theme for The Deer Hunter (1978).

Plot
Deborah Dainton suffers from a limp as a result of polio.  Treatment for the disease as a child has left her claustrophobic and reclusive in large crowds. Her rigid and controlled life is transformed when she meets a struggling artist, Leigh Hartley, at a party she begrudgingly attends to please her parents. Although she is not interested in Leigh, his persistence pays off when she finally agrees to go out on a date with him. Deborah is initially defensive toward Leigh, but he begins to grow on her. Leigh brings Deborah home for some coffee, where he asks to paint her portrait, which she declines but, eventually, allows. Some time later, Deborah persuades Leigh to see if he can sell some of his artwork to an art museum but his work is bluntly rejected by the curator. The couple then attempt to make love at Leigh’s home but Deborah suffers a panic attack, which embarrasses her. However, Leigh reassures her, saying that he doesn't mind and then proposes that Deborah move in with him, and she agrees to, much to the dismay of her parents.

Deborah soon discovers that Leigh has been married. When she confronts him about this, he apologises and says he didn't want it to ruin their blossoming relationship. Eventually, Leigh and Deborah make plans to buy an antique shop for themselves to sell his art as well as any valuable antiques Deborah scouts out. However, Leigh believes that the couple cannot afford to do this any time soon and asks Deborah for help in a robbery that he says he will personally have nothing to do with. Deborah works at an antiques shop that is holding a value of £200,000 in a vault. Leigh says that if Deborah offers security details of the antiques shop to his thieving associates, the couple will receive some of the stolen money to open their shop.

Deborah is uncomfortable with this but, learning that Leigh would be forced into participating in the theft regardless of whether she aids the heist or not, she agrees to help. Soon, Deborah finds herself coerced into physically participating in the heist when a guard the thieves had bribed into allowing them entrance inside the antiques shop takes ill. The robbery goes successfully and, upon questioning by police, Deborah avoids suspicion. However, the guilt of her participation in the theft leaves Deborah sick of herself and of Leigh. Sometime later, a woman who had previously shown up at Leigh’s place before the robbery is revealed to not be whom Leigh said she was.

Leigh had told Deborah that the woman was a neighbour of his father's and that she had dropped by his home to inform him that he was ill. However, when Deborah runs into this woman again at Leigh’s home after the robbery, she learns from the woman that she is actually Leigh’s mother and that his father is doing just fine. Deborah does some more digging and comes to the conclusion that her introduction with Leigh at the party had been planned by Leigh and his associates. Deborah discovers that she was always going to be the insider who let the thieves into the antiques shop - there had never been a bribed guard in the first place.

When she confronts Leigh about her revelations, he eventually confesses. However, he then stresses that he has grown to truly love her. Leigh begs Deborah to stay with him but, upon realising that it is hopeless, he ponders, "Is that how fragile love is? All at once everything? All at once nothing?" Alone again, Deborah posts a letter to the inspector investigating the robbery and the audience is left to assume the letter is a confession of the names of all involved in the theft.

Cast
 David Hemmings as Leigh Hartley
 Samantha Eggar as Deborah Dainton
 Emlyn Williams as Jack Foil
 Phyllis Calvert as Erica Dainton
 Ferdy Mayne as Douglas Dainton
 Francesca Annis as Arabella Dainton
 Bridget Turner as Sarah Dainton
 Dudley Sutton as Ted Sandymount
 John Woodvine as Bertie Irons
 Basil Henson as Inspector Malcolm
 Anthony Nicholls as Lewis Maud

References

External links
 The Walking Stick at the British Film Institute
 
 

1970 films
British crime drama films
1970 crime drama films
Films based on British novels
Metro-Goldwyn-Mayer films
Films directed by Eric Till
Films scored by Stanley Myers
Films set in London
Films shot at MGM-British Studios
1970s English-language films
1970s British films